An Infinity cube is a kind of mechanical puzzle toy with mathematical principles. Its shape is similar to a 2×2 Rubik's cube. It can be opened and put back together from different directions, thus creating a visually interesting effect.

Construction

The principle of the infinity cube is simple and can be made by hand with simple paper cutting and pasting. First make 8 small cubes, then arrange the small cubes in a 2 by 2 by 2 way, and tape 8 edges together. When combined, there are 28 small squares exposed and 20 small squares hidden inside.

Mathematics
Like the Rubik's Cube, the various states of the Infinity Cube can be represented as a group, but the Infinity Cube has far fewer permutations than the Rubik's Cube.

The largest group representation for Infinity Cube only contains 6 elements, and can be represented as:

See also
 Paper model
 Fidget Cube
 15 puzzle

References

External links

Magic Folding Cube - Mathematische-Basteleien
 

Rubik's Cube
Origami
Novelty items
Mechanical puzzles
Sensory toys